Woodford was a parliamentary constituency in Essex which returned one Member of Parliament (MP)  to the House of Commons of the Parliament of the United Kingdom from 1945 until it was renamed for the 1964 general election.

The constituency's only Member of Parliament for its entire existence was Sir Winston Churchill of the Conservative Party; from 1924 he had represented the Epping constituency from which Woodford was created. He represented the Woodford seat during his second tenure as Prime Minister, and continued to hold it until he retired aged 89 at the 1964 general election; it was the last seat he represented in a parliamentary career that spanned over 60 years. He was the Father of the House for the last five years of his tenure in the seat. A statue of him was unveiled on Woodford Green in the constituency in 1959.

Boundaries
1945–1955: The Borough of Wanstead and Woodford, and the Urban District of Chigwell.

1955–1964: The Borough of Wanstead and Woodford.

The constituency's boundaries were subject to a radical change in 1955, when the new Chigwell constituency was created, removing the less urbanised parts of the seat. The new Wanstead and Woodford constituency was subject to minor boundary changes reflecting alterations to the Municipal Borough of Wanstead and Woodford since the last general redistribution of parliamentary seats in 1955. The pre and post 1964 seats comprised the whole municipal borough, within its 1955 and 1964 boundaries respectively.

Members of Parliament

Election results

References 
 

Notes

Parliamentary constituencies in London (historic)
Parliamentary constituencies in Essex (historic)
Constituencies of the Parliament of the United Kingdom established in 1945
Constituencies of the Parliament of the United Kingdom disestablished in 1964
Constituencies of the Parliament of the United Kingdom represented by a sitting Prime Minister
1964 disestablishments in England